Samet Ruqi (born 10 May 1995) is an Albanian professional footballer who plays as a left back for Vllaznia Shkodër in the Albanian Superliga.

References

External links
 Profile - FSHF

1995 births 
Living people
Albanian footballers
Association football fullbacks
KF Vllaznia Shkodër players
Kategoria Superiore players
Kategoria e Parë players